James Edward Waggoner Jr., D.D. served as the eighth bishop of the Episcopal Diocese of Spokane. In 2019, he became Assisting Bishop in the Episcopal Diocese of Nevada and served through March 2021.

Waggoner Jr. holds a Bachelor of Arts degree from Marshall University and earned his Master of Divinity, Doctor of Ministry and Doctor of Divinity degrees from Virginia Theological Seminary. 

After graduating from seminary, he served the Diocese of West Virginia for twenty-one years including twelve years in parish ministry, and nine years on the bishop’s staff before being elected eighth Bishop of the Diocese of Spokane. He was consecrated in October 2000. He was appointed as the assisting bishop at the Episcopal Diocese of Nevada in April 2019. As of March, 2022, he is retired.

References

Living people
21st-century American Episcopalians
Year of birth missing (living people)
Episcopal bishops of Spokane